Doctor Dolittle (also known as Dr. Dolittle) is a 1967 American musical comedy film directed by Richard Fleischer and starring Rex Harrison, Samantha Eggar, Anthony Newley, and Richard Attenborough. It was adapted by Leslie Bricusse from the novel series by Hugh Lofting. The screenplay primarily fuses three of the books, The Story of Doctor Dolittle (1920), The Voyages of Doctor Dolittle (1922), and Doctor Dolittle's Circus (1924).

Various attempts to adapt the Doctor Dolittle series began as early as the 1920s. In the early 1960s, actress-turned-producer Helen Winston acquired the film rights in an attempt to produce a film adaptation to no success. In 1963, producer Arthur P. Jacobs subsequently acquired the rights and recruited Alan Jay Lerner to compose the songs and Rex Harrison to star in the project. After numerous delays, Lerner was fired and replaced by Leslie Bricusse. The production was continuously delayed by setbacks caused by poorly chosen shooting locations, creative demands from Harrison, and numerous technical difficulties inherent with the large number of animals required for the story. The film exceeded its original budget of $6 million threefold.

Doctor Dolittle premiered in London on December 12, 1967, where it eventually recouped $9 million during its theatrical run, earning only $6.2 million in theatrical rentals and becoming a box-office bomb. The film received negative critical reviews, but through the studio's intense lobbying, it earned nine Academy Awards nominations, including Best Picture, and won awards for Best Original Song and Best Visual Effects. The film eventually became a cult classic.

Plot
In early Victorian England, Matthew Mugg (Anthony Newley) takes his young friend Tommy Stubbins (William Dix) to visit eccentric Doctor John Dolittle (Rex Harrison) for an injured duck that Matthew had acquired from a local fisherman. Dolittle, a former medical doctor, lives with an extended menagerie, including a chimpanzee named Chee-Chee, a dog named Jip, and a talking blue-and-yellow macaw named Polynesia (the uncredited voice of Ginny Tyler). Dolittle claims that he can talk to animals. In a flashback, he explains that he kept so many animals in his home that they created havoc with his human patients, who took their medical needs elsewhere. His sister, Sarah, who served as his housekeeper, demanded that he dispose of the animals or she would leave; he chose the animals. Polynesia taught him that different animal species can talk to each other, prompting Dolittle to study animal languages so that he could become an animal doctor. He is planning his latest expedition to search for the legendary Great Pink Sea Snail.

While treating a horse for nearsightedness, Dolittle is accused by the horse's owner, General Bellowes (Peter Bull), of stealing the animal. A fox that was under Dolittle's care flees from Bellowes's hounds into a nearby barn. The hounds pursue it but are chased out by a group of skunks. The doctor explains to Bellowes that each fox travels with a skunk for protection. Bellowes's niece, Emma Fairfax (Samantha Eggar), offended by his lack of human empathy, chides Dolittle for his rudeness to her uncle. Dolittle expresses his contempt for her and other humans who hunt animals, and she storms off. Matthew falls in love with her at first sight.

An American Indian friend of Dolittle's sends him a rare Pushmi-pullyu, a creature that looks like a llama with a head on each end of its body, so that Dolittle can earn money for his expedition. Dolittle takes the creature to a nearby circus, run by Albert Blossom (Richard Attenborough), where the Pushmi-Pullyu becomes the star attraction. The doctor befriends a circus seal named Sophie who longs to return to her husband at the North Pole. Dolittle smuggles her out of the circus, disguises her in women's clothing to convey her to the coast, and then throws her into the ocean. Fishermen mistake the seal for a woman and have Doctor Dolittle arrested on a charge of murder.

General Bellowes is the magistrate in his case, but Dolittle proves he can converse with animals by talking with Bellowes's dog and revealing details that only Bellowes and the dog could know. Although Dolittle is acquitted on the murder charge, the vindictive judge sentences him to a lunatic asylum.

Dolittle's animal friends engineer his escape, and he, Matthew, Tommy, Polynesia, Chee-Chee and Jip set sail in search of the Great Pink Sea Snail. Emma, by this time fascinated by Dolittle, stows away, seeking adventure. They randomly choose their destination: Sea-Star Island, a floating island currently in the Atlantic Ocean. The ship is torn apart during a storm.

Everyone washes ashore on Sea-Star Island, where Emma and Dolittle admit they have grown to like each other. The party is met by the island's natives, whom they mistake for hostile savages. The populace are in fact highly educated and cultured from reading books that have washed ashore from innumerable shipwrecks. Their leader is William Shakespeare the Tenth (Geoffrey Holder); his name reflects the tribe's tradition of naming children after favorite authors. William explains that they are wary of strangers coming to the island, and that the tropical island is currently endangered because it is drifting north into colder waters and all the animals on the island have caught colds. Mistrust leads the islanders to blame the doctor and his party. Dolittle persuades a whale to push the island south, but this causes a balancing rock to drop into a volcano, fulfilling a prophecy that dooms Dolittle and party to die "the death of 10,000 screams". The push by the whale also causes the island to rejoin the unknown mainland, fulfilling another prophecy that dictates that the doctor and his friends be heralded as heroes and they are freed.

While treating the animals on the island, Dolittle receives a surprise patient – the Great Pink Sea Snail, which has also caught a severe cold. Dolittle discovers that the snail's shell is watertight and can carry passengers. Dolittle sends Matthew, Tommy, Emma, Polynesia, Chee-Chee, and Jip back to England with the snail. Emma wishes to stay on the island with him, but the Doctor is adamant that a relationship would never work. She finally admits her feelings for the Doctor, and kisses him goodbye. Dolittle cannot go back because he is still a wanted man. Furthermore, he wishes to investigate the natives' stories of another creature, the Giant Luna Moth. After his friends have left, Dolittle realizes painfully that he has feelings for Emma.

Sometime later, Sophie the seal arrives accompanied by her husband. They bring a message: the animals of England have gone on strike to protest his sentence and Bellowes has agreed to pardon him. Dolittle and the islanders construct a saddle for the Giant Luna Moth and Dolittle rides the creature back to England.

Cast
 Rex Harrison as Doctor John Dolittle, an eccentric scientist and veterinarian who has unique abilities of communicating with animals with variety of creature languages.
 Samantha Eggar as Emma Fairfax, a Victorian woman who at first despises and eventually befriends Doctor Dolittle by falling in love with him. She is a character created for the film. Emma's singing voice was dubbed by Diana Lee.
 Anthony Newley as Matthew Mugg, a man who is Doctor Dolittle's personal assistant and best friend.
 Richard Attenborough as Albert Blossom, the circus owner
 Peter Bull as General Bellowes, the magistrate who is Emma's uncle. He is a character created for the film.
 Muriel Landers as Mrs. Edie Blossom
 William Dix as Tommy Stubbins, the young friend of Matthew Mugg
 Geoffrey Holder as William Shakespeare X, the chieftain of Sea Star Island's natives. He is based loosely on Prince Bumpo, a character from the books
 Portia Nelson as Sarah Dolittle, Doctor Dolittle's sister.
 Norma Varden as Lady Petherington, an elderly hypochondriac who was one of the Doctor's main patients when he was an M.D.
 Ginny Tyler as the voice of Polynesia (uncredited), the pet parrot of Doctor Dolittle.
 Jack Raine as the Vicar (uncredited), a man with hay fever who was one of the Doctor's main patients when he was an M.D.
 Paul Vernon as Fisherman (uncredited), one of two who arrest Dr. Dolittle.
 Arthur Gould-Porter as Sir Rupert (uncredited), a man with a broken foot who was one of the Doctor's main patients when he was an M.D.
 Bob Winters as Juggler (uncredited)
 Queenie Leonard as Courtroom Spectator (uncredited)
 Cyril Cross as Charlie (uncredited), an Irish fisherman.
 Rufus as Dog (uncredited)
 Sophie as Seal (uncredited)
 Polynesia as Parrot (uncredited)
 Wally Ross as Elephant Act (uncredited)

Production

Development
As early as 1922, Fox Film Corporation made Hugh Lofting an offer for the film rights. Decades later, Walt Disney had sought to obtain the rights to make a film adaptation of the novels. The Disney studios wanted Lofting to surrender the ancillary rights in exchange for a flat fee of $7,500, but a suitable contract reached an impasse. In 1960, Lofting's widow Josephine gave a short-term option of the film rights to Helen Winston, a Canadian actress who had produced the film Hand in Hand (1960). In April 1962, 20th Century Fox signed a multi-picture production deal with Winston's company, Luster Enterprises, with plans to commence production in the following months. She also stated she had actor George Gobel in mind to portray the eponymous character. By that June, she had completed a script with writer Larry Watkin, but the studio decided to cancel the option two months later.

Prior to the release of What a Way to Go! (1964), producer Arthur P. Jacobs first heard that the film rights were available on December 5, 1963. Jacobs met with the Loftings' attorney Bernard Silbert in which he told him of his intentions to produce Dr. Dolittle as a musical with lyricist Alan Jay Lerner and actor Rex Harrison attached. On Christmas Day, Jacobs acquired the rights, but he was given the condition to find a distributor within six months. In January 1964, The New York Times reported that Alan Jay Lerner had signed on to write the script and compose the songs. In the following March, Jacobs pitched his project to studio executive Darryl Zanuck, in which 20th Century Fox signed on as the distributor. On March 22, Rex Harrison signed to star as Doctor Dolittle. Because Lerner's collaborator Frederick Loewe had retired, Jacobs hired André Previn to compose the musical score. The film was given a $6 million budget.

Upon numerous delays to produce a script draft, Lerner was fired from the project on May 7, 1965 due to his endless procrastination stretching over a year as well wanting to continue work on the Broadway musical, On a Clear Day You Can See Forever. Following Lerner's departure, Jacobs considered hiring the Sherman Brothers, who had just won for the Academy Award for Best Original Song for Mary Poppins (1964), but they were still under contract to Disney. Jacobs then hired Leslie Bricusse, who was in high demand after his success with the musical Stop the World – I Want to Get Off. Determined to make a good impression for his first screenplay commission, Bricusse proved agreeably productive from the start for Jacobs, suggesting numerous story ideas and adding a female leading character to the film during their first meeting on May 6. Zanuck signed Bricusse on for a trial run, hiring him temporarily to complete two songs for the film and the first twenty pages of a script. Two weeks after he was brought on to the project, Bricusse presented the song "Talk to the Animals" composed especially for Harrison. By July, Bricusse followed up with a full script that included various song suggestions while effectively blunting the book's racist content in an adaptation that was met with approval from Josephine Lofting.

For the director, Vincente Minnelli was initially attached to the project, but left before Bricusse was hired. William Wyler, George Roy Hill, and John Huston were considered, but Richard Zanuck settled on Richard Fleischer.

Casting
Lerner's replacement by Bricusse gave Harrison the chance to sit out his contract. For the role of Bumpo, Sammy Davis Jr. was hired, but Rex Harrison demanded that Davis be fired from the project as he wanted to work with "a real actor, not a song-and-dance man". In his place, he suggested Sidney Poitier despite the fact that Poitier was not a musical performer. Jacobs and Fleischer flew to New York to meet with Poitier who accepted the part only on one condition: to personally meet with Bricusse. The two then met with Davis who was performing at the Majestic Theatre to inform him that he would be released from his contract. Angered at the casting change, Davis threatened to go public and personally sue Harrison. The next day, Poitier considered leaving the role as he did not want to betray Davis, but eventually stayed in the role.

For the role of Matthew, Bing Crosby and Danny Kaye were on the shortlist, but Anthony Newley was cast, which angered Harrison because he had suggested David Wayne. Harrison later showed contempt for Bricusse's script and lyrics and demanded to sing live on set instead of lip-syncing to pre-recorded tracks. Shortly after, Harrison was fired from the project. In his place, Peter Ustinov, Alec Guinness, and Peter O'Toole were considered. Instead, they hired Christopher Plummer as a replacement, but when Harrison agreed to stay, the producers paid Plummer his agreed-upon salary to leave the production.

For the role of Emma Fairfax, Harrison suggested Maggie Smith, his co-star in The Honey Pot. Barbra Streisand and Hayley Mills were approached for the role, but salary negotiations broke down. (Mills later claimed she pulled out because her sister Juliet wanted the role. ) The role eventually went to Samantha Eggar. Her singing voice was overdubbed by Diana Lee (the daughter of playback singer Bill Lee). Just when shooting was to commence, in order to save thousands on the project, Fleischer and Zanuck decided to reduce Bumpo's role, which was drastically increased due to Poitier's casting. They regrettably informed Poitier that he would be released from his contract before he started filming his scenes. Geoffrey Holder was cast as his replacement.

Filming
In June 1966, principal photography was underway with the village scenes being shot in Castle Combe in Wiltshire. The producers did not anticipate that the trained animals for the production would be quarantined upon entering the United Kingdom, forcing replacement of the animals at considerable extra expense to meet deadlines. The producers chose to ignore reports of the area's frequently rainy summers, and the resulting weather continually interfered with shooting and caused health problems for the animals. All modern technologies such as cars, television antennas, and Coca-Cola promotional signs were removed or hidden, which irritated the locals. British Army officer (and future explorer) Ranulph Fiennes attempted to destroy an artificial dam built by the production unit because he believed it ruined the village. Budget woes continued to worsen in which production costs soared to $15 million. For the role of Albert Blossom, Richard Attenborough was hired at the last minute to replace Hugh Griffith during the shoot.

In October, scenes were later shot in Marigot Bay, Saint Lucia; this location was equally problematic, and problems with insects and frequent tropical storms delayed filming and left eight crew members bedridden due to vomiting, diarrhea, and high fever. The final scene with a giant snail was complicated not only by the poor design of the large prop, but because the island's children had recently been struck by a gastrointestinal epidemic caused by freshwater snails, and mobs of angry locals threw rocks at it. Within a month, filming had fallen 39 days behind schedule in which the production crew had to decamp back to California for reshoots.

It was noted that several of the animals bit Rex Harrison during the filming.

Personality conflicts
Personality conflicts added to the tension during the production. Anthony Newley was incensed by comments made by Harrison that he deemed antisemitic. Harrison was apparently jealous of his Jewish co-star's participation, and demanded Newley's role be reduced and disrupted scenes featuring Newley. Geoffrey Holder received racist abuse from Harrison's entourage. The younger cast members grew to loathe Harrison for this abuse and they retaliated by antagonizing him.

Animal issues
Additionally, over 1,200 live animals were used in the film including dogs, pigs, birds, and even giraffes, all of which required understudies. There are anecdotes of a goat who ate Fleischer's script and a parrot that learned to yell "cut". In one instance, ducks for the film were placed on a lake, but had apparently forgotten how to swim and began to sink, and crew members had to jump into the water to save them. Animals also bit and defecated on the cast and crew, including Harrison.

Location issues
Because of the troublesome location shoots, the production sets were later reconstructed on the Fox studio lot in California. By then, the production budget had reached $17 million. Four months later, when filming had finished, Harrison insisted on re-recording his songs live on set. This infuriated conductor Lionel Newman, but he gave in to Harrison's demands which proved to be tedious as the orchestral arrangements had to be added later. Filming was finished by April 1967.

Music

The lyrics and score music for Doctor Dolittle was composed by Leslie Bricusse and conducted by Lionel Newman. Following a test screening in Minneapolis, preview audiences wrote on their comment cards that the film was too long. Before the film was screened again in San Francisco, several verses of the songs were dropped to improve the film's pacing including "The Christmas Song". Additional edits were made including the removal of "Where Are the Words?" and "Beautiful Things" was shortened. In the original cut of the film, Dr. Dolittle and Emma did eventually begin a relationship in which he sang "Where Are the Words?", when he realizes he is falling in love with her, but in a revised version, it's actually Matthew who falls for Emma and it is his recording of the song which is featured on the soundtrack album. Both versions were filmed and both actors recorded their respective versions, but the footage for both, as well as the vocal track by Rex Harrison have been lost.

In both scenarios, "Something in Your Smile" is sung by Dolittle when he realizes he himself has fallen for Emma; although Harrison's vocal for the song survives, the footage does not exist. Ultimately, the version screened in San Jose, California, which ran 151 minutes, became the final cut of the film.

The soundtrack release was accompanied by an enormous media blitz, with half a million copies of the mono and stereo LP soundtrack being issued in retail stores four months before the premiere. The song, "Talk to the Animals", was recorded internationally by Bobby Darin, Andy Williams, Tony Bennett, Dizzy Gillespie, Jack Jones, and Andre Kostelanetz. Sammy Davis Jr., who had been dropped from the film, recorded an entire album of music featured in the film. Bobby Darin Sings Doctor Dolittle was released on Atlantic Records in August 1967. Darin's recording of "Beautiful Things" from this LP was featured in a 2013 TV commercial for Etihad Airways. A cover version of the same song by the Shiny Lapel Trio was used in a 2008 Christmas television commercial campaign for the United States retail chain Kohl's.

In November 2017, the 50th Anniversary Expanded Soundtrack from La-La Land Records was released as a lavish 2-CD set and did include numerous demos, rehearsal takes, and alternative versions.

Release
The film's first sneak preview in September 1967 at the Mann Theatre in Minneapolis was a failure. The audience consisted mainly of adults, who were not the primary target audience. The general audience response was muted during the screening and comment cards rated it poorly, with frequent complaints about the film's length. A shorter edit of the film with a younger audience previewed in San Francisco was no more successful; a still shorter edit previewed in San Jose was well enough received to be approved as the final cut.

In October, as the film's release approached, Helen Winston sued 20th Century Fox for $4.5 million alleging that the plot point about animals threatening to go on strike on Dolittle's behalf was plagiarized from her screenplay. Bricusse, who had read Winston's script, assumed it was from the books and included it in his own treatment by mistake. Because the producers only had rights to the content of the original books, they had no legal defense and were forced to settle out of court. The animal strike is mentioned in the movie but was not actually filmed.

The film had its official Royal World Charity Premiere on December 12, 1967 at the Odeon Marble Arch in London, with Queen Elizabeth II in attendance. On December 19, the film had a reserved-seating premiere at the Loew's State Theatre in New York City. Two days later, the film opened at the Paramount Theatre in Los Angeles as a benefit for the Motion Picture Relief Fund.

Marketing
Thirteen months before the film's release, Fox began an extensive marketing campaign to promote the film. On September 30, 1966, Life magazine ran a cover of Harrison in character as Dr. Dolittle riding a giraffe accompanied with a piece documenting its production. The release was accompanied with 50 licensees ready to spend $12 million in advertising. Ten thousand retail stores carried 300 promotional items from the film that amounted to an estimated retail value of $200 million.

Reception

Critical reaction
Reviewing the film for The New York Times, Bosley Crowther wrote: "The music is not exceptional, the rendering of the songs lacks variety, and the pace, under Richard Fleischer's direction, is slow and without surprise". Charles Champlin of the Los Angeles Times claimed "Doctor Dolittle, though it is beautiful, often funny, often charming, tuneful and gay, is in an odd way never really sentimentally moving, even in the sense that it sets up in us elders a yearning for lost youth. It is a picture we can greatly enjoy seeing our children enjoy, but without feeling quite at one with them". Time magazine wrote negatively: "Somehow - with the frequent but by no means infallible exception of Walt Disney - Hollywood has never learned what so many children's book writers have known all along: size and a big budget are no substitutes for originality and charm". Variety acknowledged the film as an "imperfect gem", but felt "there's sufficient values going for it to survive any barbs aimed at it by the critics".

In his annual Movie Guide, critic and historian Leonard Maltin called the film a "colossal dud". Maltin admired the film's photography, but was quick to point out how it nearly bankrupted 20th Century Fox. He admitted: "The movie has one merit: If you have unruly children, it may put them to sleep". On the review aggregation website Rotten Tomatoes, the film has an approval rating of 29% based on 21 reviews, with an average rating of 4.2/10. At Metacritic, the film has a weighted average score of 34 out of 100 based on 6 critics, indicating "generally unfavorable reviews".

Box-office
The film faced strong competition from Disney's animated feature film The Jungle Book, which had opened to considerable critical and audience acclaim two months earlier and was still in wide release. Doctor Dolittles appeal as family fare was undermined when the press drew attention to racist content in the books, prompting demands to have them removed from public schools.

According to studio records, the film needed to earn $31,275,000 in rentals to break even, and by December 1970, the film had made $16.3 million. In September 1970, the studio estimated it had lost $11,141,000 on the film.

Accolades
20th Century Fox's decision to mount an Oscar campaign for the film came partially due to their lackluster holiday slate. While a commercial success, Valley of the Dolls had received less than stellar critical reception. As a result, in January and February 1968, Fox booked 16 consecutive nights of free screenings of Doctor Dolittle provided with dinner and champagne to Academy members on the studio lot.

The film is recognized by American Film Institute in these lists:
 2004: AFI's 100 Years...100 Songs:
 "Talk to the Animals" – Nominated

Stage adaptation

In 1998, the film was adapted into a stage musical, starring Phillip Schofield as Doctor Dolittle, a pre-recorded Julie Andrews as the voice of Dolittle's parrot Polynesia, and the animatronics of Jim Henson's Creature Shop. The show ran for 400 performances in London's West End and at the time was one of the most expensive musicals produced. The musical also starred Bryan Smyth, an actor and singer who later hosted his own TV game show for RTÉ.

See also
 List of American films of 1967

References

Bibliography

External links

 
 
 
 
 

Doctor Dolittle films
1967 films
1960s musical films
1960s fantasy films
American children's fantasy films
American musical fantasy films
Films based on multiple works of a series
Films directed by Richard Fleischer
Films scored by Lionel Newman
Films featuring a Best Supporting Actor Golden Globe winning performance
Films that won the Best Original Song Academy Award
Films that won the Best Visual Effects Academy Award
Compositions by Leslie Bricusse
Films adapted into television shows
Films based on children's books
Films set in 1845
Films set in England
Films shot in California
Films shot in England
Films shot in Saint Lucia
20th Century Fox films
1960s English-language films
1960s American films